Events in the year 1996 in Norway.

Incumbents
 Monarch – Harald V
 Prime Minister – Gro Harlem Brundtland (Labour Party) until 25 October, Thorbjørn Jagland (Labour Party)

Events

 29 August – Operafjell Accident: Vnukovo Airlines Flight 2801, a Tupolev Tu-154, crashes into a mountain on Spitsbergen, an island in the Norwegian archipelago of Svalbard, killing all 141 on board.
 25 October – Gro Harlem Brundtland resigns as Prime Minister of Norway for the third time.
 25 October – Jagland's Cabinet was appointed.

Popular culture

Sports
19–24 February – The World Ski Orienteering Championships is held in Lillehammer.

Music

Film

Literature
Øystein Lønn is awarded the Nordic Council Literature Prize, for Hva skal vi gjøre i dag og andre noveller.

Television

Notable births

January
 

4 January – Lene Retzius, athlete
8 January – Niklas Castro, footballer
22 January – André Sødlund, footballer
23 January – Varg Støvland, footballer.
25 January – Lotte Miller, triathlete.
29 January – Nora Foss al-Jabri, singer
30 January – Kristian Østby, ice hockey player.

February

7 February – Sondre Rossbach, footballer
13 February – Vebjørn Hoff, footballer
15 February – Per Kristian Bråtveit, footballer
15 February – Synne Jensen, footballer
19 February – Tore Navrestad, BMX rider
19 February – Lars-Jørgen Salvesen, footballer
25 February – Jonathan Lindseth, footballer
26 February – Runar Espejord, footballer
26 February – Bjørn Inge Utvik, footballer
28 February – Karsten Warholm, athlete

March
 

3 March – Tor André Skimmeland Aasheim, footballer
10 March – Aslak Fonn Witry, footballer
14 March – Moa Högdahl, handball player
20 March – Cecilie Fiskerstrand, footballer
21 March – Aurora Mikalsen, footballer
24 March – Karina Sævik, footballer.

April
8 April – Sander Øverjordet, handball player
10 April – Fabian Wilkens Solheim, alpine skier
13 April – Kristoffer Halvorsen, cyclist
14 April – Rasmus Martinsen, footballer
14 April – Vajebah Sakor, footballer
19 April – Fredrik Michalsen, cross-country skier
22 April – Ivan Näsberg, footballer
24 April – Oda Maria Hove Bogstad, footballer
24 April – Henrik Furuseth, racing driver

May
1 May – Gustav Iden, triathlete
3 May – Morten Konradsen, footballer
5 May – Morten Thorsby, footballer
11 May – Tobias Drevland Lund, politician.
18 May – Josefine Frida Pettersen, actress
23 May – Anna Bjørke Kallestad, handball player
28 May – Mathias Normann, footballer
29 May – Halvor Egner Granerud, ski jumper
30 May – Åse Kristin Ask Bakke, politician.

June
 

3 June – Elise Skinnehaugen, handball player
6 June – Kristoffer Madsen, cyclist
15 June – Aurora Aksnes, singer and songwriter
22 June – Kristian Sæverås, handball player
29 June – Kristin Lysdahl, alpine skier
29 June – Alexandra Rotan, singer

July
3 July – Maria Hjertner, handball player
6 July – Sigrid Schjetne, murder victim (d. 2012)
12 July – Sverre Bjørkkjær, footballer
15 July – Iver Fossum, footballer
17 July – Ulrik Yttergård Jenssen, footballer
19 July – Sheriff Sinyan, footballer
21 July – Mikael Ingebrigtsen, footballer
21 July – Viljar Myhra, footballer
21 July – Markus Nakkim, footballer
23 July – Alexandra Andresen, heiress
23 July – Maria Mollestad, windsurfer
28 July – Rasmus Tiller, cyclist

August
4 August – Moses Mawa, footballer
4 August – Mohamed Ofkir, footballer
6 August – Kristine Bjørdal Leine, footballer
8 August – Syver Wærsted, cyclist
13 August – Christian Bull, ice hockey player
13 August – Mattis Stenshagen, cross-country skier
30 August – Fredrik Pallesen Knudsen, footballer
31 August – Robin Pedersen, ski jumper

September

5 September – Sigrid Raabe, singer and songwriter
14 September – Zymer Bytyqi, footballer (born in Belgium)
15 September – Fredrik Michalsen, footballer
17 September – Herman Kleppa, footballer
20 September – Mathias Skjold, cyclist
22 September – Bent Sørmo, footballer
23 September – Ingrid Landmark Tandrevold, biathlete
28 September – Erik Resell, racing cyclist
29 September 
Lotta Udnes Weng, cross-country skier
Tiril Udnes Weng, cross-country skier

October

1 October – Melanie Stokke, tennis player
9 October  
Henrik Christiansen, swimmer.
Tonje Haug Lerstad, handball player
Sondre Ringen, ski jumper.
10 October – Fredrik Flo, footballer
13 October – Jonathan Quarcoo, athete
16 October – Ludvig Hoff, ice hockey player
20 October – Henrik Fagerli Rukke, speed skater
22 October – Johannes Høsflot Klæbo, cross-country skier.
29 October – Astrid S, singer, songwriter and model
30 October – Vetle Langedahl, politician.

November
1 November – Alexander Betten Hansen, footballer
4 November – Adelén Steen, singer
9 November – Kevin Gulliksen, handball player
12 November – Sunniva Næs Andersen, handball player
24 November – Thea Louise Stjernesund, alpine skier

December
5 December – Solveig Skaugvoll Foss, politician
27 December – Timon Haugan, alpine skier
26 December – Erik Hægstad, mountain biker

Full date missing
Thea Sofie Loch Næss, actress

Notable deaths

5 January – Knut Løfsnes, politician (born 1918).
8 January – Olaf Knudson, politician (b. 1915)
13 January – Johannes Kvittingen, bacteriologist and resistance member (b. 1906)
15 January – Nils Jørgensen, fencer (b. 1911)
18 January – Kirsten Langbo, children's writer, singer-songwriter, radio entertainer and puppeteer (b. 1909).
24 January – Sigurd Bratlie, church leader (b. 1905)
20 January – Bente Grønli, para-athlete (b. 1956)
25 January – Arnold Juklerød, activist (b. 1925)
25 January – Sigmund Gjesdal, politician (b. 1929)

4 February – Sigmund Moren, author (b. 1913).
13 February – Willy Arne Wold, politician (b. 1929)

1 March – Hårek Ludvig Hansen, politician (b. 1901)
1 March – Thorleif Vangen, cross-country skier (b. 1920)
4 March – Knut Skaaluren, politician (b. 1916)
11 March – Thorleif Olsen, footballer (b. 1921)
14 March – Maj Sønstevold, Swedish composer (b. 1917)
19 March – Erik Egeland, journalist and art critic (b. 1921)
21 March – Sverre Sørsdal, boxer (b. 1900)
27 March – Bjarne Vik, politician (b. 1916)
28 March – Jacob R. Kuhnle, newspaper editor (b. 1907)
30 March – Hjalmar Hvam, Nordic skier and inventor (b. 1902)

2 April – Jens Henrik Nordlie, military officer (b.1910).
10 April – Hans Beck, ski jumper (b. 1911)
10 April – Gunnar Konsmo, speed skater (b. 1922)
11 April – Trygve Brodahl, cross-country skier (b. 1904)
11 April – Caspar Stephansen, civil servant (b. 1923)
16 April – Rolf Haugland, politician (b. 1925)
18 April – Richard August Riekeles, barrister (b. 1904)
23 April – Edvard Kaurin Barth, resistance member and zoologist (b.1913).
23 April – Gunnar Henningsmoen, palaeontologist (b. 1919)
26 April – Anders Hauge, politician (b. 1903)

1 May – Arvid Johansen, politician (b. 1910)
5 May – Bjarne Hervik, politician (b. 1911)
12 May – Kirsten Sand, architect (b. 1895)
20 May – Kristian Lien, politician (d. 1915)
11 June – Kari Berggrav, photographer (b. 1911)
15 June – Petra Mohn, politician (b. 1911)
17 June – Erling Kaas, athlete (b. 1915, died in France)
27 June – Victor Borg, physician and writer (b. 1916).
28 June – Birger Breivik, politician (b. 1912)
28 June – Ola Solum, film director (b. 1943)

1 July – Einar Hovdhaugen, politician (b. 1908)
2 July – Arvid Brodersen, sociologist (b. 1904).
2 July – Olaf Kolstad, businessman (b. 1920)
4 July – Stein Åros, politician (b. 1952)
4 July – Magnhild Hagelia, politician (b. 1904)
13 July – Karen Simensen, figure skater (b. 1907)
15 July – Hans Svendsgård, politician (b. 1937)
16 July – Jan Krogh Jensen, Danish mobster (b. 1958)
19 July – Sverre Wilberg, actor (b. 1929)
20 July – Bernt Østerkløft, Nordic combined skier (b. 1906)
21 July – Inger Jacobsen, singer and actress (b. 1923)
23 July – Georg Lous Jr., barrister (b. 1916)
25 July – Nini Haslund Gleditsch, activist (b. 1908).
26 July – Olav Totland, politician (b. 1904)

1 August – Else Høst, literary historian (b. 1908)
5 August – Helge Kvamme, jurist and businessman (b. 1938)
20 August – Bjarne Øverhaug, journalist and politician (b. 1927)
22 August – Kjell Borgen, politician (b. 1939)
23 August – Sverre Holm, sociologist (b.1910).
23 August – Øivind Holmsen, footballer (b. 1912).

3 September – Erling Christie, author (b. 1928)
4 September – Gunvor Blich, politician (b. 1908)
13 September – Thorvald Wilhelmsen, athlete (b. 1912)
14 September – Odin Hansen, politician (b. 1918)
20 September – Max Manus, resistance member and memoirist (b. 1914)
25 September – Helge Jakobsen, politician (b. 1901)
25 September – Arne Lie, civil servant and politician (b. 1927)
27 September – Johnny Larntvet, ice hockey player (b. 1916)

1 October – Carl Fredrik Engelstad, writer and theatre director (b.1915).
9 October – Per Asplin, actor (b.1928)
11 October – Rolf Wideröe, particle physicist (b.1902)
15 October – Leo Eitinger, psychiatrist, author and educator (b. 1912)
16 October – Einar Johansen, engineer and resistance member (b. 1915)
25 October – Eva Lund Haugen, author and editor (b.1907)
25 October – Solveig Gunbjørg Jacobsen, first person born and raised in South Georgia (b. 1913)
27 October – Kaare Melhuus, politician (b. 1915)

2 November – Egil Eriksen, educator and politician (b. 1909)
3 November – Martin Siem, businessman and resistance member (b. 1915).
4 November – Kjetil Mårdalen, Nordic combined skier (b. 1925)
5 November – Arne Hendriksen, ceramicist and opera singer (b. 1911)
7 November – Sverre Kolterud, Nordic combined skier (b. 1908)
13 November – Katja Medbøe actress (b. 1945)
20 November – Jens Boyesen, diplomat and politician (b.1920).
23 November – Torstein Olav Kuvaas, politician (b. 1908)
23 November – Annar Poulsson, businessman (b. 1911)
29 November – Olav Hestenes, barrister (b. 1930).

5 December – Adolf Bredo Stabell, diplomat (b. 1908)
11 December – Kirsten Myklevoll, politician (b. 1928)
14 December – Jan Didriksen, jurist and businessman (b. 1917).
25 December – Olav Tendeland, barrister and sports administrator (b. 1904)
29 December – Johan Trandem, athlete (b. 1899)
30 December – Erik Heiberg, sailor (b. 1916).

Full date missing
Knut Blom, judge (b.1916)
Jan Greve, psychiatrist (b. 1907)
John Engh, architect (b.1915)
Kjell Henriksen, scientist (b.1938)
Jac Jacobsen, designer (b. 1901)
Gudmund Seland, resistance member and newspaper editor (b. 1907)

See also

References

External links